John Barnardiston (1719–1778) was the principal librarian (protobibliothecarius) of the University of Cambridge from 1769 to 1778 and the Master of Corpus Christi College, Cambridge from 1764 until 1778. He was educated at Tonbridge School; matriculated as a sizar of Corpus Christi in 1737; and was awarded four university degrees: B.A. (1740/41); M.A. (1744); B.D. (1752); and D.D. (1764). He was a Fellow of Corpus Christi from 1745 to 1759, and became Master in 1764. He died in the college.

References 

Cambridge University Librarians
1719 births
1778 deaths
Fellows of Corpus Christi College, Cambridge
Masters of Corpus Christi College, Cambridge
Librarians from London
English librarians
18th-century English clergy